Janq'u Qala (Aymara janq'u white, qala stone, "white stone", also spelled Jankho Khala) is a mountain in the Bolivian Andes which reaches a height of approximately . It is located in the La Paz Department, Loayza Province, Luribay Municipality. Janq'u Qala lies southeast of Jach'a Ch'uñu Uma and Mula Jalanta.

References 

Mountains of La Paz Department (Bolivia)